Camatta Creek, originally Arroyo Camate, in 19th century Alta California, is a tributary stream of San Juan Creek, itself a tributary of the Estrella River, in San Luis Obispo County. 

References

Rivers of San Luis Obispo County, California
La Panza Range
Rivers of Southern California